Cárdenas is a locational  surname originating in La Rioja, Spain. In Spain, Cárdenas is the 287th most frequently surname, accounting for 0.37% of the population. It is the 296th most popular surname in the Spanish autonomous community of Catalonia.

Etymology
This habitational surname derives from places named Cárdenas in the provinces of Almería, in Andalusia, and Logroño, in La Rioja. It comes from the feminine plural of cárdeno, meaning "blue" or "bluish purple", by way of the Latin cardinus, from carduus ("thistle").

People
Adán Cárdenas (1836–1916), President of Nicaragua
Adrian Cardenas (born 1987), American baseball player
Agustín Cárdenas (1927–2001), Cuban sculptor
Alberto Cárdenas (born 1958), Mexican politician
Alejandro Cárdenas (born 1974), Mexican athlete
Alicia Cárdeñas (born 1943), Mexican volleyball player
Alonso de Cárdenas (fl. 1474–1493), Spanish noble
Alonso de Cárdenas, Spanish ambassador to the English Commonwealth (1650s).
Anahí de Cárdenas (born 1983), Peruvian singer and actress. 
Bartolomé de Cárdenas (1440-1501), Spanish painter, better known as Bartolomé Bermejo.
Bartolomé de Cárdenas (1575-1628), Spanish painter, born in Portugal.
Carlos Cárdenas (born 1976), Bolivian footballer
Cuauhtémoc Cárdenas (born 1934), Mexican politician
Dally Cárdenas (born 1966 Mexico) TV Radio Journalist
Eliécer Cárdenas (born 1950), Ecuadorian writer
Félix Cárdenas (born 1973), Colombian cyclist
Francisco Arias Cárdenas (born 1950), Venezuelan politician
García López de Cárdenas (fl. 1540), Spanish Conquistador
Gregorio Cárdenas Hernández (1915–1999), Mexican serial killer
Henry Cárdenas (born 1965), Colombian road cyclist
Jose Cardenas (born 1970), California real life character portrayed in "McFarland USA" film
Lázaro Cárdenas Batel (born 1964), Mexican politician
Lázaro Cárdenas del Río (1895–1970), President of Mexico
Leo Cárdenas (born 1938), Cuban baseball player
Luis Cárdenas (cyclist) (born 1967), Colombian cyclist
Luis Cárdenas (footballer) (born 1993), Mexican footballer
Luis Cárdenas Saavedra, Venezuelan educator
Martín Cárdenas (botanist) (1899–1973), Bolivian botanist
Martín Cárdenas (motorcycle racer) (born 1982), Colombian motorcyclist
Mauricio Cárdenas Santa María (born 1962), Colombian politician
Miguel Cárdenas (fl. 1894–1904), Mexican politician
 Miguel Cardenas (born 1973), Mexican American Jeweler
Micha Cárdenas (born 1977), American artist and theorist
Osiel Cárdenas (born 1967), Mexican drug baron
Raúl Cárdenas (born 1928), Mexican footballer and coach
Regla Cárdenas (born 1975), Cuban heptathlete
Raymundo Cárdenas (born 1950), Mexican politician
Robert Cardenas (1920–2022), American general
Sherman Cárdenas (born 1989), Colombian football midfielder
Steve Cardenas (born 1974), American martial artist, musician and retired actor
Tony Cárdenas (born 1963), California politician
Andrew Cardenas (born 2007) Mexican hottie

References

Spanish-language surnames
Surnames of Spanish origin
Sephardic surnames
Jewish surnames